

Events 
April – After a few months' employment at the court of the Duke of Mantua, Ferdinando I Gonzaga, Girolamo Frescobaldi returns to Rome.

Publications 
Agostino Agazzari – Sacrae cantiones for one, two, and four voices, Op. 18 (Venice: Ricciardo Amadino)
John Amner – Sacred hymnes of 3. 4. 5. and 6. parts for voyces and vyols (London: Edwin Allde)
Severo Bonini
 for two voices, Op. 7 (Venice: Bartolomeo Magni for Gardano)
, motets for one, two, and three voices, Op. 8 (Venice: Bartolomeo Magni for Gardano)
Bernardino Borlasca –  (Magnificat) for eight voices and various instruments, Op. 5 (Venice: Giacomo Vincenti)
Joachim a Burck –  (Erfurt: Martin Wittel for Hieronymous Reinhard), texts by Ludwig Helmbold, published posthumously
Antonio Cifra
Eighth book of motets for two, three, and four voices, Op. 17 (Rome: Giovanni Battista Robletti)
Third book of madrigals for five voices (Venice: Giacomo Vincenti)
Camillo Cortellini –  for five, six, seven, and eight voices (Venice: Giacomo Vincenti)
Christoph Demantius
 (New German Songs) for five voices, part 2 (Leipzig: Valentin am Ende's Erben for Thomas Schüler)
 for five, six, eight, and ten voices or instruments (Nuremberg: Balthasar Scherff for David Kauffmann)
Thomas Elsbeth –  for five voices (Liegnitz: Nikolaus Sartorius), music for Easter and Pentecost, including introits, masses, and sequences
Melchior Franck
 for six voices (Nuremberg: Georg Leopol Fuhrmann), a setting of the penitential psalms
 for four, five, and six voices (Nuremberg: David Kauffmann), a collection of quodlibets
 for five voices (Coburg: Justus Hauck), a wedding motet
 for six voices (Coburg: Justus Hauck), a wedding motet
 for four voices (Coburg: Justus Hauck), a birthday motet
 for four voices (Coburg: Justus Hauck), a funeral motet
Girolamo Frescobaldi – Primo libro di toccate and Libro di recercari et canzoni
Giovanni Gabrieli
, Book 2, for six to nineteen voices and instruments (Venice: Bartolomeo Magno for Gardano), published posthumously
 for three to twenty-two instruments with organ bass (Venice: Bartolomeo Magno for Gardano), published posthumously
Marco da Gagliano –  for one, two, and three voices (Venice: Ricciardo Amadino)
Andreas Hakenberger –  for eight voices and instruments (Stettin: Johann Duber)
Hans Leo Hassler –  for four, five, and six voices (Nuremberg: Paul Kauffmann), a collection of instrumental music, published posthumously. Most of the pieces are by Valentin Haussmann.
Sigismondo d'India
Third book of madrigals for five voices with basso continuo (Venice: Bartolomeo Magni for Gardano)
 (Music for Two Voices) (Venice: Ricciardo Amadino)
Giovanni Girolamo Kapsberger
Elias Mertel –  (New Musical Garden) (Strasbourg: Anton Bertram), a collection of lute music
Pietro Pace
The fifth book of motets..., Op. 10 (Venice: Giacomo Vincenti)
, Op. 12 (Venice: Giacomo Vincenti)
Francesco Pasquali – Madrigals for five voices (Venice: Giacomo Vincenti)
Enrico Antonio Radesca – First book of madrigals for five voices (Venice: Giacomo Vincenti)

Classical music 
Sethus Calvisius –  (Swan song) a setting of Psalm 90 verse 10, performed for the first time at his funeral, November 27
Alessandro Grandi – , a motet for four voices

Opera 
Francesca Caccini – Il ballo delle zigane (lost)
Claudio Monteverdi – Second edition of L'Orfeo

Births 
September 16 – Heinrich Bach, German organist (died 1692)
date unknown
Giovanni Faustini, librettist and opera impresario (died 1651)
Christopher Gibbons, organist and composer (died 1676)
probable – Francesca Campana, singer, spinet player and composer (died 1665)

Deaths 
June 15 – Innocentio Alberti, Italian cornet player and composer (born c. 1535)
August 7 – Melchior Vulpius, German composer, primarily of sacred music (born c.1570)
November 24 – Sethus Calvisius, music theorist, composer and astronomer (born 1556)

References

 
Music
17th century in music
Music by year